Ashlie Rhey (born August 17, 1961) is an American actress and model. She has appeared in many low to medium-budget feature films in many genres.

Career 
Rhey was born in West Virginia, but grew up in Ohio.  She began acting in films in 1990 after working as a model and returning to Hollywood, California, from Europe. Most of her film roles are 'nudity required' roles in B-movies and are released directly to DVD / Video or appear on cable television channels such as Showtime, Cinemax, and Playboy TV.  She has also performed in sketch comedy at The Comedy Store, in the stage production of Nudist Colony Of The Dead and modeled underwater; she is P.A.D.I. certified.

Rhey is perhaps most well known for her starring role in Bikini Drive-In which was directed by Fred Olen Ray. In addition, she has appeared in 7 editions of Playboy Special Editions, as well as the movies Draculina, Femme Fatales and Celebrity Skin.

She continues to follow her lifelong passion for comedic performance by producing her online web series sitcom Daisy Power and her stand up comedy.

References

 Film Threat Interview
 Arrow In The Head News Article
 Horror Society Interview
 Racks And Razors Interview

External links 
 
 
 Official Website
 Daisy Power Website

1961 births
American film actresses
Actresses from West Virginia
Living people
People from Belmont County, Ohio
People from Wheeling, West Virginia
21st-century American women